Quality Software is a defunct American software developer and publisher which created games, business software, and development tools for the Exidy Sorcerer, Apple II, and Atari 8-bit family in the late 1970s and early 1980s.  Asteroids in Space, written by programmer Bruce Wallace, was voted one of the most popular games of 1978-80 by Softalk magazine.

Games
1979
 Starbase Hyperion by Don Ursem 
1980
 Asteroids in Space by Bruce Wallace, later renamed Meteoroids in Space
 Battleship Commander by Matthew Jew and Erik Kilk
 Fastgammon by Bob Christiansen
 Fracas by Stuart Smith
 Head-On Collision by Lee Anders
 Tank Trap by Don Ursem
 Tari Trek by Fabio Ehrengruber
1981
 Ali Baba and the Forty Thieves by Stuart Smith
 Block Buster
 Martian Invaders by James Albanese
 QS Reversi by Lee Merrill
1982
 Beneath Apple Manor Special Edition by Don Worth
 Jeepers Creepers by James Albanese
 Name That Song by Jerry White
1983
 The Return of Heracles by Stuart Smith

Development tools
 Assembler by Gary Shannon (Atari 8-bit, 1980)
 6502 Disassembler by Bob Pierce (Atari 8-bit, 1980)
 Exidy Forth by James Albanese (Exidy Sorcerer, 1980)
 DPX Development Pac Extension by Don Ursem (Exidy Sorcerer, 1980)
 QS Forth by James Albanese (Atari 8-bit, 1981)
 Character Magic by Chris Hull (Atari 8-bit)

References

External links
Quality Software entry at MobyGames

Defunct software companies of the United States
Defunct video game companies of the United States
Defunct companies based in California